Yujiang may refer to:

Yu River (China), in the south of China
Yujiang County, in Yingtan, Jiangxi, China
Yuqiang, Chinese mythological figure